Cay is a stratovolcano in the South Volcanic Zone of the Andes in Aysén del General Carlos Ibáñez del Campo Region, Chile. The volcano is located 15 km northeast of the larger Maca Volcano and about 230 km of the Chile Trench at the intersection of NW-SE and NE-SW faults of the Liquiñe-Ofqui Fault Zone.

The volcano is composed from basalt and dacite and there is no evidence of Holocene activity. Below 1000m, several parasitic cones lie on the southwest flank of the volcano.

See also
Geology of Chile
HidroAysén
List of volcanoes in Chile

References 

Stratovolcanoes of Chile
Mountains of Chile
Volcanoes of Aysén Region
South Volcanic Zone
Mountains of Aysén Region